Pentarrhinum  is a genus of plants in the family Apocynaceae, first described as a genus in 1838. It is native to Africa.

Species
 Pentarrhinum abyssinicum Decne. - E + C + S Africa
 Pentarrhinum balense (Liede) Liede - Ethiopia
 Pentarrhinum coriaceum Schltr. - KwaZulu-Natal
 Pentarrhinum gonoloboides (Schltr.) Liede - Tanzania
 Pentarrhinum insipidum E.Mey. - South Africa
 Pentarrhinum ledermannii (Schltr.) Goyder & Liede - Burundi
 Pentarrhinum somaliense (N.E. Br.) Liede - Somalia

formerly included
moved to other genera (Pentatropis, Vincetoxicum)
 Pentarrhinum fasciculatum K.Schum., synonym of  Pentatropis nivalis (J.F.Gmel.) D.V.Field & J.R.I.Wood
 Pentarrhinum iringense Markgr., synonym of Vincetoxicum iringensis (Markgr.) Goyder

References

Asclepiadoideae
Apocynaceae genera